William Henry Jackson Beckett (1882 – March 15, 1954) was an American football coach.

Springfield YMCA Training School
Becket was the first African American person to ever be awarded a degree at Springfield College–then known as the International YMCA Training School–in Springfield, Massachusetts. He was awarded the school's Tarbell Medallion in 1947.

Howard University
Beckett became the head football coach and first full-time athletic director at Howard University in Washington, D.C. in 1917.

Late life and death
Beckett taught physical education at Sumner High School in St. Louis, Missouri for 35 years before retiring in 1954.  He died of a cerebral hemorrhage on March 15, 1954, at Homer G. Phillips Hospital in St. Louis.

Head coaching record

References

1882 births
1954 deaths
Howard Bison athletic directors
Howard Bison football coaches
Springfield College (Massachusetts) alumni
University of Pennsylvania alumni
Sportspeople from Philadelphia
African-American coaches of American football
African-American college athletic directors in the United States
African-American schoolteachers
Schoolteachers from Missouri
20th-century African-American sportspeople